George Patrick Maloney (February 28, 1928 – July 29, 2003) was a professional baseball umpire who worked in the American League from 1969 to 1983, wearing uniform number 28 when the American League adopted them for umpires in 1980. Maloney umpired 2,159 major league games in his 15-year career. He umpired in one World Series (1975), three All-Star Games (1974, 1979 and 1983, becoming the last AL umpire to wear the outside balloon protector favored by AL umpires in All-Star competition), three American League Championship Series (1973, 1976 and 1980), and the 1981 American League Division Series.

Later life
After retirement, Maloney served as commissioner of the South Florida College Baseball Umpires Association from 1986 to 1993.  He then worked for the Umpire Development Program and its successor, the Professional Baseball Umpires Corporation (PBUC), from 1996 until his death.  In that role, he evaluated and trained minor league umpires.

Death
Maloney died in Barstow, California, on July 29, 2003. He died while traveling as an observer of umpires for the PBUC.

See also 

 List of Major League Baseball umpires

References

External links
The Sporting News umpire card

1928 births
2003 deaths
Major League Baseball umpires
Sportspeople from New York (state)